James Ward Byrkit (also known as James Byrkit or Jim Byrkit) is an American film director, writer, and actor. He is best known for directing the science fiction thriller Coherence and co-writing the script for Rango, one of his many collaborations with Gore Verbinski. For Rango, Byrkit starred as several characters, most notably Waffles, a horned lizard. Byrkit also was the conceptual artist on the first three films of the Pirates of the Caribbean franchise, and designed some of the most iconic sequences of the series. Byrkit also directed the short film Tales of the Code: Wedlocked (2011), which serves as a prequel to Pirates of the Caribbean: The Curse of the Black Pearl (2003).

Byrkit's debut feature Coherence earned critical and audience praise and garnered attention for his unconventional approach in the making of the film as "proof that inventive filmmakers can do a lot with a little", and identifying him as a groundbreaking talent.Since its release, Coherence has become an international sensation and regularly appears on ranking lists of best films.

Byrkit's follow-up project, Shatter Belt, is an episodic series in the tradition of Twilight Zone. Production on the first four episodes was completed in 2022, with the world premiere scheduled for 2023 at the SXSW Film & TV Festival.

Awards
Breakthrough Director (nominated) at the Gotham Independent Film Awards 2014
Next Wave Best Screenplay at the Austin Fantastic Fest for Coherence (2013)
Maria Award for Best Screenplay at the Sitges Film Festival for Coherence (2013)
Carnet Jove Jury Award for Best In Competition at the Sitges Film Festival for Coherence (2013)
Black Tulip Award for Best Feature Debut at the Imagine Film Festival for Coherence (2014)
Imagine Movie Zone Award, Special Mention at the Imagine Film Festival for Coherence (2014)
Annie Award for Writing in a Feature Production for Rango (2011, won, shared with John Logan and Gore Verbinski)

Filmography

As director
Shatter Belt (2023)
Coherence (2013)
Pirates of the Caribbean: Tales of the Code: Wedlocked (2011, short)
Rango (2011, video game)
Fractalus (2005, short)
Yes, and... (2005, short)
Special Unit 2 (2001, 1 episode - The Rocks)
Stop at Nothing (2001, TV)

As writer
Shatter Belt (2023)
Coherence (2013)
Rango (2011, video game)
Rango (2011, film, story by)
Fractalus (short, 2005)
Yes, and... (short, 2005)

As producer 
 The Forest (2016)
 Coherence (2013)
 Fractalus (2005)

As himself 
 Prop Culture (2020) Episode: "Pirates of the Caribbean: Curse of the Black Pearl"

References

External links
 
 

Living people
American directors
American male screenwriters
Annie Award winners
Year of birth missing (living people)